The superflip or 12-flip is a Rubik's Cube configuration in which all 20 of the movable subcubes (or "cubies") are in the correct permutation, and the eight corners are correctly oriented, but all twelve of the edges are oriented incorrectly ("flipped").  It has been shown that the shortest path between a solved cube and the Superflip position requires 20 moves under the usual half-turn metric (HTM), and that no position requires more moves (although, contrary to popular belief, there are many other positions that also require 20 moves).

Under the more restrictive quarter-turn metric (QTM), the Superflip requires 24 moves, and is not maximally distant from the solved state. Instead, when Superflip is composed with the "four-dot" or "four-spot" position, in which four faces have their centers exchanged with the centers on the opposite face, the resulting position may be unique in requiring 26 moves under QTM.

Solutions
This is one possible sequence of moves to generate the Superflip (starting from a solved Rubik's cube), recorded in Singmaster notation; It consists of the minimal 20 moves under HTM, though it requires 28 quarter-turns:

One of the solutions using the minimal 24 quarter-turns is shown below (though it requires 22 HTM moves):

There is another solution that uses slice turns; it requires just 16 moves under the slice-turn metric (STM), (compared to 19 and 22 such moves in the first and second algorithm respectively), although there are 22 HTM moves and 32 quarter-turns:

Lastly, the following solution is both easiest to learn and fastest to do for humans, as the sequence of moves is very repetitive (even though it is not optimal under any metric – it requires 24 moves under STM and 36 moves under both HTM and QTM):

where  and  indicate rotations of the entire cube (and thus do not count as moves).

See also
God's algorithm

Notes

References

Further reading
 
 
 

Rubik's Cube